When We Are Married is a 1943 British comedy-drama film directed by Lance Comfort and starring Sydney Howard, Raymond Huntley and Olga Lindo.

Plot

The film is a screen version of the 1938 stage play by J. B. Priestley, in which three Edwardian era Yorkshire couples, who were all married on the same day 25 years earlier, gather to celebrate their joint silver wedding anniversary, only to be told that due to a legal technicality, their marriages were not valid and that for the past quarter-century they have all effectively been living in sin.  Some react with horror at potential scandal, while others glimpse the possibility of freedom from a deadbeat spouse, or regret potential loves that got away after they were "married".  Much drama ensues as the couples each re-evaluate their respective marriages, but after grievances have been aired and new understandings forged, all ends happily.  The Monthly Film Bulletin, known for its exacting standards, complimented the film as "an exceedingly amusing, if somewhat unkind, picture of a Yorkshire chapel-going fraternity...under the skilful direction of Lance Comfort all the cast bring the characters to life".

Cast
 Sydney Howard as Henry Ormondroyd
 Raymond Huntley as Albert Parker
 Olga Lindo as Maria Helliwell
 Marian Spencer as Annie Parker
 Ethel Coleridge as Clara Soppitt
 Lloyd Pearson as Joe Helliwell
 Ernest Butcher as Herbert Soppitt
 Barry Morse as Gerald Forbes
 Lesley Brook as Nancy Holmes
 Marjorie Rhodes as Mrs. Northup
 Charles Victor as Mr. Northup
 Cyril Smith as Fred Dyson
 George Carney as Landlord
 Lydia Sherwood as Lottie Grady
 Patricia Hayes as Ruby Birtle

References

External links 
 
 When We Are Married at BFI Film & TV Database

1943 films
1940s historical comedy-drama films
British historical comedy-drama films
Films directed by Lance Comfort
British black-and-white films
British films based on plays
Films set in the 1900s
Films set in Yorkshire
Films based on works by J. B. Priestley
1943 comedy films
1943 drama films
Films shot at British National Studios
1940s British films